A special election was held in  on February 1, 1826 to fill a vacancy caused by the resignation of Joseph Kent (A), who had been elected Governor of Maryland.

Election results

Weems took his seat on February 7, 1826

See also
List of special elections to the United States House of Representatives

References

Maryland 1826 02
Maryland 1826 02
1826 02
Maryland 02
United States House of Representatives 02
United States House of Representatives 1826 02